The 2010 Historic Grand Prix of Monaco was the seventh running of the Historic Grand Prix of Monaco, a motor racing event for heritage Grand Prix, Voiturettes, Formula One, Formula Two and Sports cars.

Report 
Entered for Race B was a CTA-Arsenal, believed to be the only remaining example in existence. It had been restored specifically for the event. There were issues with the car's legality, perhaps due to uncertainty whether it belonged in Race A or Race B. Driver Josef Otto Rettenmaier retired the car after qualifying for Race B as he did not trust the brakes.

In Race D, Richard Hein and Tommaso Gelmini qualified first and third respectively, but neither made the start due to mechanical issues.

In Race E, Gary Pearson drove the Cooper T60 with which Bruce McLaren had won the 1962 Monaco Grand Prix. The car had been restored to running order for this event and gave out smoke when it ran. Pearson ran third in the race, but was mistakenly black-flagged when oil was discovered on the circuit. It was later discovered that the Lotus 24 of Frank Sytner had been the car leaking oil.

Race F featured ex-F1 drivers Nanni Galli in a Tecno PA123 which he had raced during 1972, and Richard Attwood, who snapped a driveshaft on the formation lap.

In Race G, Stéphane Richelmi held second place until suffering a loss of gears on lap 9.

Emanuele Pirro won Race H in the same Martini Mk34 chassis he had raced at Monaco in 1981. Valerio Leone ran a distant second but was taken out by a lapped car late in the race, bringing out a safety car that compressed the running order.

Results

Summary

Série A: Pre 1947 Grand Prix Cars

Série B: Front Engine Grand Prix Cars (1947–1960)

Série C: Pre 1953 Sport Cars

Série D: Formula 3 Cars 1000cc (1964–1970)

Série E: Rear Engine Grand Prix Cars (1954–1965)

Série F: Formula 1 Grand Prix Cars (1966–1974)

Série G: Formula 1 Grand Prix Cars (1975–1978)

Série H: Formula 3, 1600cc (1971–1973) and 2000cc (1974–1984)

References 

Historic motorsport events
Monaco Grand Prix
Historic Grand Prix of Monaco
Historic Grand Prix of Monaco